Jef Aerts (born 26 May 1972) is a Belgian writer of children’s and youth literature.

Life and career 
After publishing four novels, poetry and theater, Jef Aerts has been writing for young readers since 2012.

For the picture book Bigger than a Dream he worked with the Swedish-Dutch illustrator Marit Törnqvist. In 2014 this book was awarded the Book Lion (Boekenleeuw, prize for the best Dutch-language children's book.

Jef Aerts received three Zilveren Griffel awards: for Bigger than a Dream, Fish don’t melt and The Blue Wings (illustrated by Martijn van der Linden).

Aerts’ children’s and youth books have been translated and sold in 15 languages, including English, German, Swedish, Chinese, Korean, Russian and Persian.

Jef Aerts lives and writes in a small farm close to Leuven.

Works (selection) 
 The Little Paradise (Het kleine paradijs, 2012)
 Bigger than a Dream (Groter dan een droom, 2013)
 Fish don’t Melt (Vissen smelten niet, 2013)
 Horse in Boots (Paard met laarzen, 2015)
 Cherry Blossom and Paper Planes (Kersenhemel, 2017)
 The Blue Wings (De blauwe vleugels, 2018)
 Ronke's Night (De nacht van Ronke, 2021)

Awards and nominations (selection) 
 2014: Zilveren griffel, Groter dan een droom
 2014: White Raven, Groter dan een droom
 2014: Boekenleeuw, Groter dan een droom
 2014: Zilveren Griffel, Vissen smelten niet
 2018: Vlag en Wimpel, Kersenhemel
 2019: Zilveren Griffel, De blauwe vleugels
 2020: Laureate IBBY Honour List, De blauwe vleugels

References

External links 

 
 Jef Aerts · dbnl (in Dutch), Digital Library for Dutch Literature
 Jef Aerts (in English), Flanders Literature

Belgian children's writers
1972 births
Living people
Belgian male novelists
Belgian male poets
21st-century Belgian male writers
21st-century Belgian poets
21st-century Belgian novelists